Hafiz is a crater on Mercury. Its name was adopted by the International Astronomical Union (IAU) on June 23, 2014. Hafiz is named for the Persian poet Hafez.

Within Hafiz is a crater that is a dark spot of low reflectance material (LRM).  The dark spot is associated with hollows.

References

Impact craters on Mercury